Steps are a British dance-pop group consisting of Lee Latchford-Evans, Claire Richards, Lisa Scott-Lee, Faye Tozer and Ian "H" Watkins. Steps were formed in May 1997 and achieved a series of charting singles between 1997 and 2001 including two number-one singles in the UK (one a double A-side), two number-one albums in the UK, 14 consecutive top 5 singles in the UK and a string of hits throughout Europe. The group has sold over 22 million records worldwide in addition to acquiring a BRIT Award nomination in 1999 for Best Newcomer while supporting Britney Spears on tour the same year. When Richards and Watkins departed to form a recording duo, the group disbanded on 26 December 2001. Their penultimate single reached number five in the UK charts while their final album of greatest hits, Gold (2001), was the group's second number-one album in the UK.

Steps re-formed in May 2011 for a four-part documentary series on Sky Living titled Steps: Reunion. The series started airing on 28 September, following an announcement of a second greatest-hits album, The Ultimate Collection, that was released on 10 October 2011. The album entered the charts at number one, becoming the band's third album to achieve this feat. The second series of Steps: Reunion, titled "Steps: On the Road Again", aired on Sky Living in April 2012; the series followed the band as they embarked on their sellout 22-date UK tour. On 24 September 2012, the group confirmed they would release their fourth studio album, Light Up The World, on 12 November 2012, alongside a six-date Christmas tour, starting on 30 November and ending on 5 December. The group re-formed for a second time on 1 January 2017 in celebration of their 20th anniversary, and later announced their fifth studio album, Tears on the Dancefloor, which was released in April 2017.

Steps' sixth studio album, What the Future Holds, was released on 27 November 2020. It was preceded by three singles, the title song "What the Future Holds", "Something in Your Eyes" and "To the Beat of My Heart". Their seventh studio album, What the Future Holds Pt. 2, with 10 new tracks, four stripped-back versions of songs and a new sound for some tracks, was released in 2021. The band's third compilation album, Platinum Collection was released in August 2022, and debuted at number 1 in the UK, making Steps the first British, mixed-gender group to achieve four number 1 albums in four different decades.

History

1997–1999: Formation, commercial success and Step One
Steps were formed by Steve Crosby and Barry Upton (writers of "5,6,7,8") alongside manager Tim Byrne after auditioning hopefuls who answered an ad in The Stage newspaper. Byrne had previously been involved in the production of the Smash Hits Poll Winners Party, the BBC collaboration with the pop magazine Smash Hits.

After auditions, the original line-up of Watkins, Scott-Lee, Derek O'Brien, Maddy Chan, and Mitch Stevens was finalised and the band started shooting promotional images and recording tracks. However, O'Brien, Chan and Stevens left, as they wanted more than a one-hit wonder, and saw no long-term future with Steps. New auditions were held on 7 May 1997, and in conjunction with the manufacturers, they selected Tozer, Latchford-Evans and Richards as the remaining members.

Their first single "5,6,7,8" was a techno line dance song. Though not typical of what became their style, it was their first hit both in the UK and internationally. Despite only peaking at number 14, the single achieved considerable longevity in the fast-paced singles climate of 1997–1998, racking up over four months on the UK chart. The track remains one of the highest-selling singles never to reach the top 10 on the UK Singles Chart. Its release in Australia gave the group their first number one in 1998.

Tim Byrne then founded a management and production company, Byrne Blood, with former BMG head of marketing and video, Victoria Blood, which took over sole management of Steps and was also instrumental in the creation and management of A1.

The group were then presented to pop impresario, Pete Waterman who signed them to his Eastern Block Unity Label (EBUL) in a partnership with his long time associates, Jive Records. Waterman and his new PWL production partners, Mark Topham and Karl Twigg, reworked the "5,6,7,8" demo, introducing the prominent fiddle into the arrangement. Waterman stated that whilst he was pleased with the final mix of "5,6,7,8", his co-producers were less so, to the extent that on the single liner notes they did not take a credit, although they were credited on all subsequent releases, such as the Step One album. In April 1998, Steps launched their second single, a cover version of Bananarama's "Last Thing on My Mind", which became their first UK top ten, peaking at number 6.

By August 1998, Steps continued to build momentum with their third single "One for Sorrow" which peaked at number 2, and began an unbroken chain of 14 consecutive Top 5 hits on the UK singles chart. Steps' singles success translated into album sales, with their debut album Step One entering the chart at number 2. It was certified 5× Platinum following a run of 50 weeks in the Top 20.

The next single release was a double A-side which provided Steps with their signature song and biggest career seller. The single was a cover version of the Bee Gees' "Tragedy" and original track "Heartbeat". The single was released in November 1998, when it charted at number 2. Following enduring popularity over the Christmas period, the single rebounded up the chart and became their first number-one hit in January 1999, eight weeks after it was initially released. The single eventually sold over a million copies and occupied the chart for 30 weeks.

The final track to be released from Step One was "Better Best Forgotten". Because of the continued success of the previous single, the CD release was delayed by nearly two months. Nonetheless, "Better Best Forgotten" entered the chart at number 2.

Steps were part of the ensemble that released "Thank ABBA for the Music" (a medley of ABBA's "Take a Chance on Me", "Dancing Queen", "Mamma Mia" and "Thank You for the Music") in March 1999, as performed at the BRIT Awards. The other artists singing were Tina Cousins, Cleopatra, B*Witched, and Billie, known collectively as the Supertroupers. The single later peaked at number four. The group was also nominated for Best Newcomer. Pete Waterman claimed to have been told days before the ceremony that Steps had won the award, as voted for by listeners of BBC Radio 1. However, on the night the award was handed to the Scottish band Belle & Sebastian, who were assumed to be rank outsiders. Despite the allegation that a significant number of votes for Belle & Sebastian were traced to one location (two computers sited in a particular UK university campus), the band held onto their award as foul play was denied by organizers of the BRIT Awards.

A fan-created Steps fanzine, Count Me In, started in 1998. This became known for its Steps Photostory, in which cut-out members of Steps went on a variety of fun adventures. It ran for 13 issues and later issues included interviews with Steps themselves, as well Dermot O'Leary, Pink and other pop-culture figures of the time. Count Me In can be viewed by visiting the British Library archive where all issues are held.

1999–2000: Steptacular, International tour and Buzz 
In July 1999, Steps released the first single from an all-new album, "Love's Got a Hold on My Heart". Once again they narrowly missed the number-one spot following a last-minute surge by Ricky Martin. After the single's release, Steps went to America to support Britney Spears on her 1999 ...Baby One More Time Tour. A remixed version of "One for Sorrow" was included in the film Drive Me Crazy and released as their debut American single. They were also successful in Europe and Australasia.

Steps returned home to release their second album, Steptacular, which was accompanied by "After the Love Has Gone". The album charted at number 1 and was eventually certified 4× Platinum, thus becoming their second UK million selling album. The group subsequently released an album in North America which was titled Step One and was an amalgamation of their first two albums. The group's next two singles, "Say You'll Be Mine/Better the Devil You Know" and "Deeper Shade of Blue" (originally recorded by labelmate Tina Cousins for her debut album), both continued their top-five run.

In February 2000, Disney Channel aired a concert special featuring Steps and another group, Youngstown, titled "Steps and Youngstown in Concert". The concert itself promoted the group and the sales of the album.

In July 2000, Steps released another double A-side, consisting of the Steptacular track "When I Said Goodbye" and an entirely new song, "Summer of Love". The latter was a Latino-flavoured pop song, which later appeared on their third album. Steps were also awarded the BRIT Award for Best Selling Live Act of the year in 2000.

In October 2000, "Stomp" became their second number one single. The third album, Buzz, followed shortly and whilst it was less successful than their first two albums, went on to achieve double platinum status and contains five UK Top 5 singles. The group worked with many American and Swedish producers who had created hits for other Jive artists such as Britney Spears, 'N Sync, and the Backstreet Boys. The following single, "It's the Way You Make Me Feel", reached number 2 upon its January 2001 release. Steps promoted Buzz worldwide and did not return to the UK until May, when they released "Here and Now / You'll Be Sorry".

2000–2001: Gold, group tensions, Watkins' and Richards' departure, and split
Split rumours started circulating after it was announced that Steps would release a greatest hits album. The group continuously denied this in their interviews. "Chain Reaction", a cover of the popular Diana Ross song, was released as the first new single from Gold: Greatest Hits. The single became their biggest in almost two years. The second single, "Words Are Not Enough/I Know Him So Well", was another top five hit. It would become their final single as a group until their re-formation in 2012.

In 2001, following their Boxing Day split, the group were heavily criticised by their fans. Many UK tabloid papers published the fans' disgust on their front pages, displaying quotes taken from Steps message boards. After the group spent much of 2001 strongly dismissing claims of a split, fans were furious and accused the group of capitalising on the success of a host of merchandise released in the lucrative pre-Christmas market. However, it has since come to light that both H and Claire left the group on the last night of the Steps' Gold: Greatest Hits tour, because of their ongoing unhappiness within the group, although Steps' official statement stated that the split was caused by their belief that they should end on a high, while they were at their best and could be remembered for being the best of their kind. H and Claire went on to form a duo and signed to Warner Music for a reputed £5 million (over five albums), although they only released one album, Another You Another Me, before being dropped due to poor album sales.

Jive released a remix and B-side compilation in 2002. The Last Dance featured previously released remixes, B-sides and rarities. The album charted at number 57 without any promotion. A planned release for the track "Baby Don't Dance" was scrapped in November 2002. However, promotional copies were pressed and a video based upon their live Gold tour briefly aired on MTV. Claire Richards performed "Tragedy" on ITV1 special Everybody Dance Now in 2008. This was also Richards' first public appearance in six years.

2011–2012: Reunion, The Ultimate Collection and touring
Since the band's break-up, rumours had been circulating that they would reunite in one form or another. In 2009, Lee Latchford-Evans revealed that the band had been approached to perform a series of concerts. He hinted that a future reunion was possible, but said "it isn't the right time right now".

In early 2011, rumours began circulating that Steps would reunite for a TV series and a one-off concert to mark the tenth anniversary of their 2001 split. The reunion was denied by band's members, including Claire Richards on her Twitter page. Richards also announced on 9 July 2011, that a Steps reunion would be "silly", but she would "never say never". Contrary to these claims, just 12 days later, it was announced that Steps would be reuniting for a four-part Sky Living documentary, depicting their split and the interim years. The band would also release their Ultimate Collection, as well as potential new material.

In a promo for the show each member revealed their true feelings, with Watkins sharing that he regrets the way it all ended but insisting: "If I were to revisit it and turn the clock back, I would probably have done it exactly the same way." Evans commented: "They took something away from three people that we loved and we didn't get a choice because certain people took that choice away from us and I think that is very unfair." Steps: Reunion premiered on Sky Living at 9pm on Wednesday, 28 September.

Steps said in a 2011 interview with Digital Spy that they believed there was a gap in the market for their brand of "happy pop". Scott-Lee said: "Times have changed, but we are in a recession and Steps' music was very light-hearted and fun, so there could be a place for that in today's society," "What else is interesting is that there aren't any boy/girl pop groups out there at the moment, so there's definitely a gap there."

In the first episode, the group opened up about the tension in the band, with Scott-Lee saying "problems first arose when H started flying in Britney Spears' private jet while the rest of them travelled by bus." Before, Richards stated "Further cracks appeared when I discovered that H had been secretly dating the band's manager Tim Byrne." The second episode focused on the band talking about their reasons for the breakdown of communication and friendships in the group and also documented the first time they had all been together in the same room for over a year. The girls then flew to Marbella, Spain to bond whilst the boys went to Wales. The fourth episode showed Steps discussing the possible future of the band.

Steps' newly recorded and produced version of "Dancing Queen" (not to be confused with the 1999 version) was added to the track list for The Ultimate Collection.

On 10 October 2011, Steps appeared for the first time on This Morning, performing "It's the Way You Make Me Feel" and "Tragedy" and announced their 14-date 2012 arena tour entitled The Ultimate Tour. They also announced that they had re-formed as a band full term. On 14 October 2011, Steps appeared on Lorraine and sang "Deeper Shade of Blue", which they also sang during an appearance on Loose Women on 24 October 2011. They then announced they had added 6 performances and removed 2 from the tour, bringing the total to 18 dates; they also announced a new date at the Summer Saturdays at Newmarket Racecourse on 25 August 2012. On 16 October 2011, their new album The Ultimate Collection went to number one in the UK Albums Chart. Steps performed a medley of their singles, including "Deeper Shade of Blue" and "One for Sorrow", on 19 November for Children in Need. They also appeared on Alan Carr: Chatty Man on 25 December 2011 and performed a medley of "One for Sorrow", "Deeper Shade of Blue" and "Tragedy". A DVD of the Reunion tour entitled Steps – The Ultimate Tour Live was released on Monday 29 October 2012. It charted at number one on the Official Charts Company's Music Video Chart on 4 November 2012. In November 2012, Steps talked about their Christmas tour in an interview and hoped that there would be more music and tours in 2013.

2012–2016: Light Up the World and hiatus
It was announced that the group would release their own fragrance called Guilty Pleasure in a disco ball-styled bottle. It was put out to stores on 1 November 2012. They also brought out an official calendar for 2013. It was released on 15 October 2012. On 13 October 2012, Steps without H appeared on BBC Radio 2 with Graham Norton. Their new single "Light Up the World" aired for the very first time. They announced that it would be released on 22 October 2012.

Following their sell-out arena tour, the group performed a number of summer shows and public appearances. At the end of June, Tozer confirmed on Twitter that there would be more from the group after their summer shows. In August, H posted a picture on Twitter confirming the group were in the studio recording. In September, it was confirmed that a new album, titled Light Up the World, would be released by the end of the year, consisting of Christmas songs. On 12 November 2012, Steps released Light Up the World, their fourth studio album, which consisted of Christmas songs. The lead single from the album, "Light Up the World", was released on 22 October 2012. The group also embarked on a six-date Christmas tour entitled Christmas with Steps in November 2012 through December 2012. In an interview with Metro, H confirmed that there could be two new fragrances for 2013, following the success of Guilty Pleasure. In an interview with Digital Spy, H also confirmed that he would like Rylan Clark to be a support act on their next tour. Tozer appeared on Loose Women in February 2013 and when asked about the future of the band she commented saying that they would soon be meeting and discussing what to do next. In March 2013, H announced on Twitter that he and the rest of Steps were having a meeting.

In May 2013, it was announced that Steps were going to be taking a break due to heavily touring last year, confirming on several occasions, after some speculation, that they have not split up. During this hiatus they each pursued solo projects.

Faye appeared in the worldwide premiere of the musical The Tailor Made Man from March to April and appeared in the musical Singin' in the Rain from December through to March. H appeared in Joseph from June to October and in Jack and the Beanstalk in December. Lee ran three marathons and took time out to manage his wife's band Concrete Rose. Claire has her own fashion range for Fashion World, which she also models. In January 2014, Claire announced on Twitter that she had begun work on her first studio album.

A new compilation entitled 5,6,7,8: The Collection was released on 27 November 2015 through Music Club Deluxe containing most of the singles with some B-sides and remixes. This is a budget-release CD which has no official connection to Steps or any previous management or record company but a selection of tracks licensed to Music Club Deluxe for release. The album is available on CD and via download. On 1 April 2016, a three-disc compilation entitled Stomp All Night: The Remix Anthology was announced, featuring 36 of the group's remixes, 20 of which have never before been released in the UK. The release includes a brand new remix of "Say You'll Be Mine".

2017–2021: Tears on the Dancefloor and What the Future Holds Parts 1 & 2 
The group officially confirmed on 1 January 2017, that they were ending their five-year break following their reunion tour and Christmas album. Their first appearance was at London's G-A-Y nightclub, where the group confirmed the reunion. The group later performed at the I Love The 90's event in Hasselt, Belgium, due to the band's massive popularity in Belgium during the late 1990s.

The group's fifth studio album, Tears on the Dancefloor, was released on 21 April 2017 and entered the charts at number 2. On 5 March 2017, the group confirmed the release of the new album, alongside its lead single, "Scared of the Dark", and a 22-date tour, Party on the Dancefloor. A deluxe edition of the album, titled Tears on the Dancefloor: Crying at the Disco, was released on 27 October.

In November 2017, Tozer announced that the reunion was no longer just a 20th-anniversary celebration and that the group intends to continue after their 2018 Summer of Steps tour. In April 2018, Richards announced that following their summer tour, they would begin work on their sixth studio album. In February 2019, Richards announced the group would begin recording their next album during the summer months.

On 7 September 2020, via their social media accounts, Steps announced the release date of their album entitled What the Future Holds. The album was released on 27 November of the same year, with pre-orders available from 8 September. The next day, they confirmed a new 14-date UK tour (with special guest Sophie Ellis-Bextor) starting in November 2021. The first single from the album was the Greg Kurstin-and-Sia-penned "What the Future Holds", released on 9 September 2020. It was followed by "Something in Your Eyes" on 27 October 2020. "To the Beat of My Heart" was released as the album's third single in January 2021.

In April 2021, Steps announced that an upcoming deluxe version of What the Future Holds was now to become a completely separate album entitled What the Future Holds Pt. 2 with 10 new tracks, four stripped back versions of songs and a new sound for some tracks.

The first single of What the Future Holds Pt. 2 was confirmed as a reworked version of "Heartbreak in This City" featuring Michelle Visage. The second single was revealed as "Take Me For A Ride", released on July 29, 2021. Steps released a third single from What the Future Holds Pt. 2 on August 20, 2021, a cover of British pop group Five Star's 1987 hit "The Slightest Touch". On 18 November 2021, Steps released their fourth single, "A Hundred Years of Winter", written by Darren Hayes. Later that month, the band postponed the last few dates of the tour as two musicians and several crew members had tested positive for COVID-19.

2022: 25th anniversary and Platinum Collection 
Steps announced a string of summer shows to celebrate their 25th anniversary including headlining Mighty Hoopla on 3 June 2022. On 30 May 2022, it was announced the band would release their third official greatest-hits album, titled Platinum Collection, which would include 21 tracks including two new tracks. The single "Platinum Megamix" was released on 1 June 2022 and debuted at number 15 on the UK Top 100 Singles Sales Chart on 3 June 2022. On 7 July 2022, Steps released the single "Hard 2 Forget". The single, a cover of the 2020 Vincint track, debuted on 8 July 2022 at number 21 on the UK Official Singles Download Chart Top 100. Platinum Collection was released on 19 August 2022. On 26 August, the album debuted at number 1 on the UK Official Top 100 Albums, and also placed at number 1 on the Official Albums Sales Chart and at number 2 on the Official Vinyl Albums Top 40. Previously unreleased song "The Runner" (cover version of The Three Degrees 1978 song) debuted at number 56 on the UK Official Singles Downloads Chart, despite not being released as an official single.

Filmography
Steps had their own talent show named Steps to the Stars, in which young people performed three acts to be judged by a public vote. It was revealed on the next show who would go through to the final. This was shown on CBBC in 2000/2001. Two series were aired, presented by H and Claire, although the group performed one of its classics at the end of each show. The show featured a young Danny Jones in a band called Y2K in which he played guitar with his sister and their friend, and the eventual winner was a female solo singer called Jenny-Lynn Smith. Also featured were Gareth Gates, before he found fame on Pop Idol, and Sean Smith from pop duo Same Difference before he found fame with his singing partner and sister, Sarah Smith, on The X Factor.

In 2011, Steps re-formed and appeared in their own reality series called Steps: Reunion. It followed them as they rebuilt their friendships following the group's acrimonious split in December 2001. Following the huge success of the first series, a second series followed the group on their first arena tour in over ten years, airing in 2012. Both series were aired on Sky Living. Following the series' success, ITV2 decided to bring back seven pop bands of the late 1990s and early 2000s in a nine-part series: The Big Reunion.

Awards and nominations
{| class="wikitable sortable plainrowheaders" 
|-
! scope="col" | Award
! scope="col" | Year
! scope="col" | Category
! scope="col" | Nominee(s)
! scope="col" | Result
! scope="col" class="unsortable"| 
|-
! scope="row" rowspan=4|Brit Awards
| rowspan=1|1999
| British Breakthrough Act
| rowspan=5|Themselves
| 
| rowspan=1|
|-
| rowspan=2|2000
| Best Selling Live Act of 1999
| 
| rowspan=2|
|-
| rowspan=2|British Pop Act
| 
|-
| 2001
| 
|
|-
!scope="row"|British LGBT Awards
| 2022
| Music Artist
| 
| 
|-
!scope="row"|Popjustice £20 Music Prize
| 2017
| Best British Pop Single
| "Scared of the Dark"
| 
| 
|-
! scope="row"|The Record of the Year
| 1998
| Record of the Year
| "One for Sorrow"
| 
|

Discography

 Step One (1998)
 Steptacular (1999)
 Buzz (2000)
 Light Up the World (2012)
 Tears on the Dancefloor (2017)
 What the Future Holds (2020)
 What the Future Holds Pt. 2 (2021)

Tours

Headlining
Step One Tour (1999)
Next Step Tour (1999)
Steptacular Tour (2000)
Steps into Christmas (2000)
Gold Tour (2001)
The Ultimate Tour (2012)
Christmas with Steps (2012)
Party on the Dancefloor Tour (2017)
Summer of Steps Tour (2018)
What the Future Holds Tour (2021)
25th Anniversary Summer Tour (2022)

Opening act
...Baby One More Time Tour (opened for Britney Spears) (1999)

See also

 Pete Waterman Entertainment
 RCA/Jive Label Group
 Sony BMG
 Stock Aitken Waterman

References

External links 
 
 

 
Brit Award winners
English dance music groups
English vocal groups
English pop music groups
Dance-pop groups
Musical groups from London
Musical groups established in 1997
Musical groups disestablished in 2001
Musical groups reestablished in 2011
Teen pop groups
Live Here Now artists